William Peter Wragg (born 11 December 1987) is a British Conservative Party politician. He has been Member of Parliament (MP) for Hazel Grove in Greater Manchester since May 2015. He is a vice-chairman of the 1922 Committee.

Early life
Wragg was born on 11 December 1987 in Manchester. He attended Poynton High School before gaining a first in History from the University of Manchester.

Wragg became a school governor in 2008 and went on to volunteer as a student mentor. He unsuccessfully stood as the Conservative candidate in the Hazel Grove ward of Stockport Metropolitan Borough Council in 2010, but was elected in the same ward in 2011. He completed a two-year Teach First training programme as a primary school teacher before taking up a job as a caseworker for a Conservative MP in 2014.

Parliamentary career
Wragg was first elected as the MP for Hazel Grove at the 2015 general election, winning the seat from the Liberal Democrats on a swing of 15.2% and becoming the first Conservative MP there since 1997. He stood down as a councillor and, in 2016, the Liberal Democrats won back the Hazel Grove council ward seat.

He campaigned for Brexit in the 2016 EU membership  referendum and, following the resignation of Prime Minister David Cameron, campaigned for Andrea Leadsom in the 2016 Conservative leadership election.

Wragg held his seat at the 2017 general election with a slightly reduced majority. He had been targeted by the successor to the Remain campaign, Open Britain, for his support of a hard Brexit.

In Parliament, Wragg has served on the Procedure, Education and Backbench Business Committees, and the Finance Committee.

In February 2016, it was reported that Wragg had moved back to his parents' house in order to save money for a deposit on buying a house.

In May 2016, it was reported that Wragg was one of a number of Conservative MPs being investigated by police in the 2015 general election party spending investigation, for allegedly spending more than the legal limit on constituency election campaign expenses; he was interviewed, under caution, by Police in 2017, after which Police passed his file to the Crown Prosecution Service (CPS). In May 2017, the CPS decided that no criminal charges would be brought.

In January 2020, Wragg was elected to chair the Public Administration and Constitutional Affairs Select Committee. Wragg won the contest by 335 to 183 votes.

Following an interim report on the connections between colonialism and properties now in the care of the National Trust, including links with historic slavery, Wragg was among the signatories of a letter to The Telegraph in November 2020 from the "Common Sense Group" of Conservative Parliamentarians. The letter accused the National Trust of being "coloured by cultural Marxist dogma, colloquially known as the 'woke agenda'".

In 2020, Wragg became a "lockdown rebel" and a steering committee member of the lockdown-sceptic COVID Recovery Group alongside a group of Conservatives who opposed the UK government's December 2020 lockdown. The Guardian has described the group as European Research Group (ERG)-inspired, and a response by backbench Conservatives to Nigel Farage's anti-lockdown Reform UK party.

On 12 January 2022, Wragg called for Prime Minister Boris Johnson to resign over the Westminster lockdown parties controversy. Wragg publicly confirmed he had submitted a letter of no confidence in Johnson. On 20 January 2022, Wragg accused whips of blackmail against Conservative MPs who were believed to support ousting Johnson as prime minister. He said he has heard stories of MPs told they could face loss of public investment in their constituencies and releasing of embarrassing stories. On 24 January, the Metropolitan Police met with Wragg to discuss the allegations.

Wragg became the sixth MP to call for Prime Minister Liz Truss's resignation on 19 October 2022. He also submitted a letter of no confidence in her leadership.

On 22 November 2022, Wragg announced he would be standing down at the next general election.

Personal life 
Wragg lives in Hazel Grove and London. He is openly gay.

References

External links

1987 births
Conservative Party (UK) MPs for English constituencies
LGBT members of the Parliament of the United Kingdom
English LGBT politicians
Gay politicians
Living people
UK MPs 2015–2017
UK MPs 2017–2019
UK MPs 2019–present
Members of the Parliament of the United Kingdom for Hazel Grove
Councillors in Stockport
British Eurosceptics